The Sign of Love: Book 2 is a 2014 Burmese drama television series. It aired on MRTV-4, from September 15 to November 7, 2014, from Mondays to Fridays at 19:10 for 40 episodes.

Cast
Wint Yamone Naing as Chit Su
Han Lin Thant as Zwe Htet
Kyaw Hsu as Hnin Myaing
Myat Thu Thu as Wint Shwe Yi
Phone Shein Khant as Wunna
Min Tharke as Shin Takkha
Thet Oo Ko as U Myint Nanda
Soe Nandar Kyaw as Myat Noe Khin
Eaint Kyar Phyu as Daw Shwe Myaing
Su Hlaing Hnin as Daw San Nu Yin
May Thinzar Oo as Daw Aye Nyein
Theingi Htun as Daw May Mi
Khin Moht Moht Aye as Daw Sein Khin
Hla Hla Win as Phwar Zar Yu

References

Burmese television series
MRTV (TV network) original programming